Southland Credit Union is a not-for-profit community-chartered credit union in California, United States serving the residents of Orange County and Los Angeles County. They have over 60,000 Members and $1 billion in assets. Southland Credit Union's member-owners get a full spectrum of financial products.  Southland Credit Union was founded in 1936 to serve the financial needs of Los Angeles County employees.

History
 1936 - Southland Credit Union established to serve the employees of the Los Angeles County Flood Control District with seven volunteers.
 1944 - State charter granted; name is changed to "Los Angeles County Civic Center Credit Union."
 1981 - Corporate office moved from Los Angeles to Downey.
 1989 - Merged with Auto Pro Federal Credit Union, South Coast Medical Center Federal Credit Union and Mobilehome Owners Federal Credit Union
 1991 - Merged with Graphic Arts Credit Union.
 1994 - Name changed to "Southland Civic Federal Credit Union" and the Credit Union received a federal charter. Merged with Los Angeles County Bar Association Credit Union.
 1991 - Merged with Saints Federal Credit Union.
 1996 - Merged with Sunrise First Federal Credit Union, which served the employees of Simpson Paper Company.
 1999 - Converted back to a state charter with a name changed to "Southland Civic Credit Union" and completed a merger with Los Angeles Internal Revenue Service Employees Federal Credit Union.
 2001 - Merged with FAMCO Federal Credit Union, which served the employees of AMERON, now National Oilwell Varco.
 2002 - Name changed to "Southland Credit Union" and corporate office is moved to Los Alamitos.
 2009 - Merged with Cityside Federal Credit Union, formally the Los Angeles Times Federal Credit Union.
 2011 - Acquired the Garden Grove branch of Fullerton Community Bank.
 2012 - Merged with Santa Monica City Employees Federal Credit Union.
 2014 - Merged with Westside Employees Federal Credit Union, which served the employees of Saint John's Health Center in Santa Monica and merged with Patriots Federal Credit Union in Tustin, which served legacy military personnel stationed at Marine Corps Air Station El Toro.
 2017 - Merged with Harbor Federal Credit Union, which served the employees of Harbor–UCLA Medical Center in Carson.

Community charter
Southland Credit Union's community charter allows for membership to residents and individuals, who work, worship or attend school in the following communities:
Orange County, California
Los Angeles, California

Select Employer Groups
Membership with Southland Credit Union is available to employees of approximately 300 Select Employer Groups (SEG), including:

Bandai
Blank Rome
Bureau of Alcohol, Tobacco, Firearms and Explosives
City of Garden Grove Employees 
City of La Mirada Employees 
City of Lakewood Employees 
City of Lawndale Employees 
City of Los Alamitos Employees 
City of Lynwood Employees 
City of Paramount Employees 
City of Santa Monica Employees 
City of Seal Beach Employees
Commerce Casino
Costco
Davis Elen Advertising
Drug Enforcement Administration
Employees and Retirees of Los Angeles County
Frieda's Inc.
General Services Administration
Gibson, Dunn & Crutcher
Horiba
Internal Revenue Service
Jones Day
Latham & Watkins
Los Alamitos Unified School District
Los Angeles County Bar Association
Los Angeles County Sheriff's Department
Los Angeles Times
Morgan, Lewis & Bockius
Paul Hastings
Perkins Coie
Sidley Austin
Tarzana Treatment Centers
United States Army
United States Attorney
United States Bankruptcy Court
United States Department of Homeland Security
United States Department of the Treasury
United States District Court
United States Marshals Service
Zodiac Aerospace

Performance

Texas Ratio
The Texas Ratio is an indicator of how much capital a bank has available compared to the total value of loans considered at risk. As of December 31, 2020 Southland Credit Union had $1.64 million in non-current loans and owned real-estate with $101.67 million in equity and loan loss allowances on hand to cover it. This gives Southland Credit Union a Texas Ratio of 1.61% which is excellent. Any bank with a Texas Ratio near or greater than 100% is considered at risk.

Texas Ratio trend
The Texas Ratio for Southland Credit Union decreased dramatically from 6.96% as of December 31, 2019 to 1.61% as of December 31, 2020, resulting in a positive change of 76.86%.This indicates that the balance sheet and financial strength for Southland Credit Union has improved dramatically in recent periods.

Deposit growth
In the past year, Southland Credit Union has increased its total non-brokered deposits by $139.49 million, resulting in 20.56% growth for the year. A strong track record of growth is an indicator of consumer confidence and the bank's ability to strengthen its balance sheet. The growth Southland Credit Union has shown is excellent.

Capitalization
Both FDIC and NCUA consider capitalization levels of banks and credit unions to be of high importance. Higher capitalization allows for a greater buffer when cover loans that may fail in the future. Southland Credit Union has $995.94 million in assets with $101.67 million in equity, resulting in a capitalization level of 10.21%, which is above average.

Products and services
Southland Credit Union offers:
 Checking and savings accounts
 Vehicle loans
 Personal loans
 Credit cards
 Home loans
 Home equity lines of credit
 Investment services
 Insurance services
 Retirement planning
 Student loans 
 Business services

References

Further reading
Southland Credit Union | Annual Report — Southland Credit Union Annual Report

External links
Official website
Official Facebook Page

Credit unions based in California
Banks established in 1936